Ottawa cathedral may refer to:

 Christ Church Cathedral (Ottawa), Anglican
 St. Elias Antiochian Orthodox Cathedral, Antiochian Orthodox
 Notre-Dame Cathedral Basilica, Ottawa, Roman Catholic

See also
 List of Ottawa churches